Belle Goldschlager Baranceanu (July 17, 1902January 17, 1988) was an American painter, teacher, muralist, lithographer, engraver and illustrator.

She was born Belle Goldschlager in Chicago, Illinois (Baranceanu was her mother's maiden name). Her parents, both Romanian Jewish immigrants, separated during Belle's early childhood, and she grew up on her maternal grandparents' farm in North Dakota.

Biography 

She studied at the Minneapolis School of Fine Arts under Anthony Angarola, to whom she was engaged until his death in 1929. Active in Chicago during the 1920s as a teacher and exhibitor, she worked in Los Angeles, California in 1927–1928. She moved to San Diego in 1933.

She  painted an oil-on canvas-mural in the La Jolla post office (Scenic View of the Village)  in 1936 for the Section of Painting and Sculpture. As a muralist for the Works Progress Administration curriculum project, she painted murals for Roosevelt Junior High School (Building Padre Dam and Potola's Departure) in 1937–38. Between 1939 and 1940 she completed a WPA mural titled The Seven Arts in the La Jolla High School Auditorium.

Baranceanu was a member of the Chicago Society of Artists.

She exhibited her work at the Art Institute of Chicago, Carnegie Institute, Los Angeles County Museum of Art, Denver Art Museum, and others. Baranceanu taught at the La Jolla School of Arts & Crafts and Frances Parker School. She died in La Jolla on January 17, 1988.

References

External links 
 Belle Baranceanu Biography
 Belle Goldschlager Baranceanu, Journal of San Diego History 32:3 (Summer 1986)
 Belle Baranceanu (1902-1988), San Diego History Center biography

1902 births
1988 deaths
20th-century American painters
American muralists
American women painters
American people of Romanian-Jewish descent
Artists from Chicago
Jewish American artists
Painters from California
Public Works of Art Project artists
Painters from Illinois
American lithographers
American engravers
American women illustrators
American illustrators
American women printmakers
Minneapolis College of Art and Design alumni
Artists from North Dakota
20th-century American women artists
Women muralists
Federal Art Project artists
20th-century American printmakers
Women engravers
Women lithographers
20th-century American Jews
20th-century lithographers
20th-century engravers